The Quirke Mine is an abandoned uranium mine located approximately 13.5 km north of Elliot Lake, Ontario, owned and operated by Rio Algom Ltd. The site has been rehabilitated and is currently undergoing environmental monitoring.

The mine was in operation from 1956 to 1960, and again from 1968 to 1990, during which time it produced 44 million tons of ore from two separate shafts.

Other mines in the area
 Stanleigh Mine
 Spanish American Mine
 Can-Met Mine
 Milliken Mine
 Panel Mine
 Denison Mine
 Stanrock Mine
 Pronto Mine
 Buckles Mine
 Lacnor Mine
 Nordic Mine

See also
Quartz-pebble conglomerate deposits
Uranium mining
List of uranium mines
List of mines in Ontario

References

External links
 MiningWatch Canada - Elliot Lake Uranium Mines
 CIM Bulletin - The Story of Elliot Lake

Uranium mines in Ontario
Mines in Elliot Lake
Underground mines in Canada
Former mines in Ontario
Rio Algom